Crocidura annamitensis is a small species of shrew from Vietnam, where it is found in the Annamite Range. It is a small shrew- no more than 60 mm in head and body length, and is gray in color. It has a relatively short tail.

References 

Crocidura
Mammals of Vietnam
Mammals described in 2009